Sølve Skagen (born 17 February 1945) is a Norwegian film director. He was born in Eid, Sogn og Fjordane, and is brother of writer Kaj Skagen. Among his films are Hard asfalt from 1986 and Brun bitter from 1988. Hard asfalt was Norway's submission for the 59th Academy Award for Best Foreign Language Film and was entered into the 15th Moscow International Film Festival.

External links

References

1945 births
Living people
People from Eid, Norway
Norwegian film directors